The Comanche Complex Fires were four fires that burned together in Arvin, California forming the largest fire of the 2011 California wildfire season. The fire, which burned from September 10 to September 16 burning  of land. The four fires, which ultimately combined, were the Comanche Fire, the Knob Fire, the Wolf Fire, Harris Fire.

References

2011 California wildfires
Wildfires in Kern County, California